Discoveries of the Deep is a 1993 video game developed by Capstone Software and published by GameTek UK for DOS and Windows.

References 

1993 video games
Adventure games
DOS games
Educational video games
Submarine simulation video games
Video games developed in the United States
Windows games
GameTek games
Single-player video games